"Incredible" is a song by jungle producer M-Beat featuring General Levy on vocals. It was first released as a single in 1994 and reached No. 39 on the UK Singles Chart. A re-release a few months later featuring new mixes was much more successful, peaking at No. 8, and remaining on the chart for 12 weeks. "Incredible" was the first jungle track to reach the top 10 in the UK. It was released on Renk Records.

General Levy's vocals on "Incredible" were adapted from a song he had previously written, titled "The Wickedest General". "Incredible" uses lyrics from Levy's song "Mad Them" as well as the beat from M-Beat's song "Style". In response to General Levy's remark, following the runaway success of "Incredible", that he was "runnin' jungle", an ad hoc "Committee" of DJs and others influential in the jungle community launched a campaign against the song.

The song was featured in the 2002 British comedy film Ali G Indahouse and appears on the film's soundtrack.

Track listing
UK 12" (first release)
A1. "Incredible" (Original Mix)
B1. "Incredible" (Booyaka Mix)
B2. "Incredible" (Instrumental)

UK 12" (re-release)
A1. "Incredible" (Original Mix)
A2. "Incredible" (Rhino Mix)
B1. "Incredible" (Underground Mix – Drum & Bass)
B2. "Incredible" (Underground Mix – Deep Bass)

UK CD single
 "Incredible" (Original Mix) – 4:56
 "Incredible" (Jungle Steppers Mix) – 5:02
 "Incredible" (Underground Mix – Deep Bass) – 4:54
 "Style" (Sweet Girl Mix) – 4:23

Charts

References

1994 songs
1994 singles
M-Beat songs
General Levy songs